Gambler's Choice is a 1944 film directed by Frank McDonald and starring Chester Morris and Nancy Kelly.

Plot
In 1897, three children, Ross Hadley, Mike McGlennon and Mary Rogers, are brought before a judge for stealing a man's wallet. McGlennon and Rogers have no prior record, so they are released to their parents. Hadley, however, is sent to a reform school.

In 1911, Hadley quits working for casino owner Chappie Wilson to start his own business, financed by Fay Lawrence, the rich widow of a bookie. To compete, Wilson hires a beautiful singer, Vi Parker, "the Garter Girl". When Hadley sees her perform, he recognizes her as Mary Rogers. He takes her to a police station, much to her confusion. There she is reunited with Lieutenant Mike McGlennon. Then Hadley takes them both to see his grand, brand-new gambling establishment. Hadley offers McGlennon a small share, but McGlennon is an honest cop. Hadley also offers "Vi" a job. She turns him down, but when Wilson and a henchman come to retrieve her, Hadley punches Wilson, and McGlennon takes care of the henchman, so she has to work for him. Lawrence is not happy about this arrangement and tries to fire her, but Hadley pays off her loan to him and kicks her out.

Cast
 Chester Morris as Ross Hadley
 Nancy Kelly as Mary Rogers, aka Vi Parker
 Russell Hayden as Mike McGlennon
 Lee Patrick as Fay Lawrence
 Lloyd Corrigan as Ulysses S. Rogers
 Sheldon Leonard as Chappie Wilson
 Lyle Talbot as Yellow Gloves Weldon
 Maxine Lewis as Bonnie D'Arcy
 Tom Dugan as Benny
 Charles Arnt as John McGrady
 Billy Nelson as Danny May

Production
In 1942, MGM remade Manhattan Melodrama, a film about two boyhood friends who grow up on opposite sides of the law. It was titled Gambler's Choice, then Northwest Rangers. This movie has a similar storyline, with two boyhood friends growing up on opposite sites of the law.

In June 1943 Pine-Thomas signed a new contract with Paramount which included three musicals, and two bigger-budgeted pictures, plus three wartime movies which would co-star Chester Morris and Russell Hayden as a team (replacing Morris and Richard Arlen). Hayden had just left Columbia Pictures.

In September 1943 Pine Thomas bought a story by James Edward Grant and Howard called "Tenderloin" as a vehicle for Chester Morris. (They also bought Hell's Afloat for Morris which was never made.) Russell Hayden and Nancy Kelly were cast in November 1943 when the film's title was changed to Gambler's Choice.

Filming took place in December 1943.

Soundtrack
 Nancy Kelly - "The Sidewalks of New York" (music by Charles Lawlor, lyrics by James W. Blake)
 Nancy Kelly - "Hold Me Just a Little Closer" (music by Albert von Tilzer, lyrics by Benjamin Barnett)

See also
List of American films of 1944

References

External links
 
 
Gambler's Choice at TCMDB
Gambler's Choice at BFI
Review of movie at Variety
 
Review at Variety

1944 films
1944 crime drama films
American black-and-white films
American crime drama films
1940s English-language films
Films directed by Frank McDonald
Films about gambling
1940s American films